The canton of Baccarat is an administrative division of the Meurthe-et-Moselle department, northeastern France. Its borders were modified at the French canton reorganisation which came into effect in March 2015. Its seat is in Baccarat.

It consists of the following communes:

Amenoncourt
Ancerviller
Angomont
Arracourt
Athienville
Autrepierre
Avricourt
Azerailles
Baccarat
Badonviller
Barbas
Bathelémont
Bénaménil
Bertrambois
Bertrichamps
Bezange-la-Grande
Bionville
Blâmont
Blémerey
Bréménil
Brouville
Bures
Buriville
Chazelles-sur-Albe
Chenevières
Cirey-sur-Vezouze
Coincourt
Deneuvre
Domèvre-sur-Vezouze
Domjevin
Emberménil
Fenneviller
Flin
Fontenoy-la-Joûte
Fréménil
Frémonville
Gélacourt
Glonville
Gogney
Gondrexon
Hablainville
Halloville
Harbouey
Herbéviller
Igney
Juvrecourt
Lachapelle
Laneuveville-aux-Bois
Laronxe
Leintrey
Manonviller
Marainviller
Merviller
Mignéville
Montigny
Montreux
Mouacourt
Neufmaisons
Neuviller-lès-Badonviller
Nonhigny
Ogéviller
Parroy
Parux
Petitmont
Pettonville
Pexonne
Pierre-Percée
Raon-lès-Leau
Réchicourt-la-Petite
Réclonville
Reherrey
Reillon
Remoncourt
Repaix
Saint-Clément
Sainte-Pôle
Saint-Martin
Saint-Maurice-aux-Forges
Saint-Sauveur
Tanconville
Thiaville-sur-Meurthe
Thiébauménil
Vacqueville
Val-et-Châtillon
Vaucourt
Vaxainville
Vého
Veney
Verdenal
Xousse
Xures

References

Cantons of Meurthe-et-Moselle